The 2016 Norwegian Football Cup Final was the final match of the 2016 Norwegian Football Cup, the 111th season of the Norwegian Football Cup, the premier Norwegian football cup competition organized by the Football Association of Norway (NFF). The match was played on 20 November 2016 at the Ullevaal Stadion in Oslo, and was contested between the First Division side Kongsvinger and the Tippeligaen side  Rosenborg. Rosenborg defeated Kongsvinger 4–0 to claim the Norwegian Cup for an eleventh time in their history, and also become the first team in Norway to win the double two years in a row.

Route to the final

(TL) = Tippeligaen team
(D1) = 1. divisjon team
(D2) = 2. divisjon team
(D3) = 3. divisjon team
(D4) = 4. divisjon team

Match

Details

See also
2016 Norwegian Football Cup
2016 Tippeligaen
2016 1. divisjon
2016 in Norwegian football

References

External links 
 Cup final at altomfotball.no

2016
Rosenborg BK matches
Kongsvinger IL Toppfotball matches
Football Cup
Sports competitions in Oslo
November 2016 sports events in Europe
2010s in Oslo
Final